Automatic system recovery is a device or process that detects a computer failure and attempts recovery. The device may make use of a Watchdog timer. This may also refer to a Microsoft recovery technology by the same name.

External links
HP ProLiant, Blade - Automatic Server Recovery (ASR) archivied from original on archive.org
How does ASR (Automatic System Recovery) detect server hang?

Embedded systems